was a Japanese samurai of the late Edo period. He was the ninth feudal lord of the Shishido han (Hitachi Province) and the Daimyō of 10,000 koku. His father, Matsudaira Yoritaka, was the eighth feudal lord of the Shishido han.

Career
Yorinori succeeded Yoritaka, who retired in 1846. Yoritaka, who retired as the lord, helped his son be appointed as a sub-assistant. Tokugawa Yoshiatsu was the tenth feudal lord of the Mito Domain, which was the Shishido han's head family.

In 1864, Yorinori was ordered by the Shogunate to proceed to Mito, in order to deal with an uprising of the Tengu Party, whose members had proposed the policy with the motto of "Revere the emperor, expel the barbarians". The Tengu Party was dissatisfied with the foreign policy of the Shogunate.

In spite of his initial unwillingness, Yorinori opposed the Ichikawa Party, the aristocratic family group in the Mito Domain, and the enemy of the Tengu Party. He was subsequently blamed by the Shogunate for his opposition to the Ichikawa Party. Yorinori intended to appeal to the Shogunate by providing a reasoned defense for his actions, but—without being afforded the opportunity to defend himself—he was instead commanded to commit seppuku for disgracefully serving as "the enemy leader". Yorinori died by Seppuku at the age of 35 on October 5, (Japanese calendar date) 1864, and most of his vassals were executed. In addition, Yorinori's father, Yoritaka, was deprived of feudal tenure, made to forfeit his residence in Edo, and was placed in custody of the Uzen Shinjo han, thereafter tainting the Shishido han.

In 1868, the new government of  ordered the restoration of the Shishido han, and Yorinori's father, Yoritaka (who had since retired), was restored as the feudal lord (10th feudal lord) of the Shishido han, and the following year being named han Chiji (domainal governor) by Imperial order.

In July 1880, Yorinori's younger brother,  was handed down the birthright from his father, and Yoriyasu was awarded the title of viscount on July 8, 1884.

Family
Natsu was grandmother of Yukio Mishima.

In popular fiction

Yorinori's younger brother, Matsudaira Yoriyasu, has been the model of the main characters in the several short stories of Yukio Mishima.

See also
Mitogaku
Shinto
Tokugawa Nariaki

References
 "Tokugawa Shōgun-ke to Matsudaira Ichizoku". Rekishi Dokuhon, January 2006, p. 239.

Notes

1831 births
1864 deaths
Daimyo
Samurai
Mitorenshi-Matsudaira clan